Winnabow is a unincorporated community and census-designated place in Brunswick County in the U.S. state of North Carolina. It is located at  It is mainly a farming community along US Highway 17. There is no large retail presence in the area, except a Han Dee Hugo's convenience store at the intersection of NC 87 and US 17 South. Mill Creek Farm and Garden Center is the feed store for the area and is located beside Willetts Farm. Winnabow has a post office and a  zip code of 28479.

References
United States Geological Survey (2005).  "Winnabow". Retrieved 13 September 2005.
http://www.brunswickbeacon.com/content/congratulations-50-years-winnabow-vfd
http://www.myreporter.com/?p=8392

Unincorporated communities in Brunswick County, North Carolina
Cape Fear (region)
Unincorporated communities in North Carolina